Waddles may refer to:

 Charleszetta Waddles (1912–2001), African-American activist and Pentecostal church minister
 Waddles (Gravity Falls), a recurring character in the animated TV series Gravity Falls
 Waddles Run (Long Run tributary), a river in Ohio County, West Virginia, United States
 Myopathic gait or waddling, a form of gait abnormality

See also
 Waddle (disambiguation)